The list below shows the 69 Sites of Special Scientific Interest (SSSIs) in the Lancashire area of search. Note that English Nature, the designating body for SSSIs in England, uses the 1974-1996 county system, and this list follows the same approach. Some sites that might be expected to be here could therefore be in the Merseyside or Greater Manchester lists.

Of the 69 sites listed, 14 are listed purely for their geological interest, and 49 are listed for biological interest. A further 6 sites have both geological and biological significant features.

For other counties, see List of SSSIs by Area of Search.

Sites

Notes
Reason for designation; either for the site's biological interest, or its geological interest.
Data rounded to one decimal place.
Grid reference is based on the British national grid reference system, also known as OSGB36, and is the system used by the Ordnance Survey.
Link to maps using the Nature on the Map service provided by Natural England.

References

External links

 
Lancashire
Sites Of Special Scientific Interest